An oxo-Diels–Alder reaction (also called an oxa-Diels–Alder reaction) is an organic reaction and a variation of the Diels–Alder reaction in which a suitable diene reacts with an aldehyde to form a dihydropyran ring. This reaction is of some importance to synthetic organic chemistry.

The oxo-DA reaction was first reported in 1949 using a methylpentadiene and formaldehyde as reactants.

Asymmetric oxo-DA reactions (including catalytic reactions) are well known. Many strategies rely on coordinating a chiral Lewis acid to the carbonyl group.

See also
 Aza Diels–Alder reaction
 Imine Diels–Alder reaction

References

Cycloadditions
Oxygen heterocycle forming reactions
Name reactions